Tomas Costanza (born September 2, 1976) is a certified-platinum American record producer/songwriter and owner of the Killingsworth Recording Company. Born in Massapequa, New York, he was first noted in the music industry as the lead singer and guitarist for the band Diffuser. In addition to being signed to Hollywood Records in 2000, several of the band's songs were featured on major motion picture soundtracks including Freaky Friday, Confessions of a Teenage Drama Queen, Mean Girls and Mission: Impossible 2. As a record producer, Costanza has worked with artists such as Macklemore, Boys Like Girls, Darren Criss, Rachel Platten, 2 Chainz, Icona Pop and Trixie Mattel. Costanza's big break came in 2011 after producing X-Factor finalist Katie Waissel's debut album which reached #1 on the U.K. charts and remained there for five weeks.

Life and career

Childhood and Youth
Costanza was born and raised in North Massapequa, New York. His father was a New York City police officer and his mother a school bus driver for the local middle school. While in his pre-teens, Costanza discovered the liberating bombast of hard rock, listening to bands like Van Halen and Black Sabbath while also becoming infatuated with the musical styles of Michael Jackson and The Bee Gees. At the age of 10, he began teaching himself guitar and bass. Costanza explains, "When I first heard Eddie Van Halen's guitar solo on Michael Jackson's "Beat It", I knew I wanted to be a rock star."

Career Beginnings and Diffuser
Costanza attended the High School of the Performing Arts to study classical composition with professors from the Juilliard School. He later attended Berklee College of Music but dropped out to pursue a career as a recording artist. In 1998, Costanza founded the band Flu Thirteen which later became Diffuser. Hollywood Records signed the band in 2000 and released two critically acclaimed LP recordings including Injury Loves Melody (2001) and Making the Grade (2003). In 2010, Alternative Press magazine cited Diffuser as "One of the Top 22 most influential and underrated bands of 2000s."

Diffuser disbanded in 2003 to pursue other musical interests. Due to overwhelming support from a small but loyal following, Diffuser re-united in fall of 2007 to release their third studio album, Sincerely, Wasting Away. The band still plays shows on occasion.

Artist & Repertoire (Disney/Universal)

In 2003, Costanza was hired by Bob Cavallo  to work A&R under Jason Jordan for Hollywood Records. He also signed a publishing deal with Seven Peaks/Disney during the same time period. In 2007, he became Head of A&R for Chamberlain Records (Universal) where he produced artists such as Cold Forty Three, The Anix, Brianna Taylor, and Katie Waissel. In 2005, Costanza was noted in Blender magazine as saying, "I'm not chasing after what's current. The music I sign has to be compelling and two steps ahead of the curve. I always hope people will like the artists I work with, but at the end of the day, I'm the one that has to love it."

Producing, Songwriting, and Recognition

Costanza established the Killingsworth Recording Company in 2003. Beginning with a facility in New York, he expanded to Los Angeles in 2008. In January 2009, Costanza was recruited by Academy Award-winning music supervisor Richard Glasser (The Illusionist, Crash, Revolutionary Road) to write for his film and TV placement company.

In 2013, Killingsworth Recording Company partnered with music licensing company Pulse/Hitcher Music and Imagem International to create custom music catalogs for film and TV. Killingsworth has scored music for networks such as Comedy Central, Disney Animation Studios, Viceland, the CBS Dream Team and TV shows such as Ocean Mysteries with Jeff Corwin, Huang's World, Hood Adjacent with James Davis, The Academy Awards, American Horror Story, Grey's Anatomy, The Henry Ford Innovation Nation, RuPaul's Drag Race and How to Get Away with Murder.

Since 2014, Costanza has co-written and produced twelve Billboard #1 albums and licensed over 1000 song placements. Select placements include Apple, Galaxy, Ford, Google, Amazon, Target, as well as NBC, ABC, HBO, Showtime, Marvel, and Call of Duty.

He is currently working on a Broadway musical entitled DRAG: The Musical.

Songwriting credits

Songwriting credits include soundtracks such as Mission: Impossible 2, Freaky Friday, Confessions of a Teenage Drama Queen, Summer Catch, The Nut Job and Zootopia which have collectively sold over 4.2 million copies worldwide R.I.A.A. Costanza also wrote and produced theme songs for Live with Kelly and Ryan, Viceland, YouTube, ABC, CBS and Disney as well as songs for The Good Wife, American Horror Story, The View, The Academy Awards, Grey's Anatomy, True Blood, Ugly Betty and Dexter.

References

Record producers from New York (state)
Living people
1974 births
People from North Massapequa, New York